District 25 of the Texas Senate is a senatorial district that currently serves all of Comal and Kendall counties, and portions of Bexar, Guadalupe, Hays, and Travis counties in the U.S. state of Texas.

The current Senator from District 25 is Donna Campbell.

Top 5 biggest cities in district
District 25 has a population of 815,771 with 610,120 that is at voting age from the 2010 census.

Election history
Election history of District 25 from 1992.

Previous elections

2018

2014

2012

2010

2006

2002

2000

1996

1994

1992

District officeholders

Notes

References

25
Bexar County, Texas
Comal County, Texas
Guadalupe County, Texas
Hays County, Texas
Kendall County, Texas
Travis County, Texas